Kankoyo is a township in the Mufulira District of Copperbelt Province in Zambia. The settlement is located next to the Mufulira copper mine and is heavily polluted by sulphur dioxide emissions from the mine.

References

Populated places in Copperbelt Province